Neis can refer to:

Neis, a genus of nudan ctenophores
Neis (Νηίς), daughter of Zethus or Amphion. The Neitian gate at Thebes, Greece was believed to have derived its name from her.
Barbara Neis (born 1952), Canadian social scientist
Bernie Neis (1895–1972), American baseball player
Fabrício Neis (born 1990), Brazilian tennis player
Reagan Dale Neis (born 1976), Canadian actress

See also
Nei (disambiguation)